Obliquogobius is a genus of gobies native to the Indian Ocean and the northwestern Pacific Ocean.

Species
There are currently six recognized species in this genus:
 Obliquogobius cirrifer Shibukawa & Aonuma, 2007
 Obliquogobius cometes (Alcock, 1890)
 Obliquogobius fluvostriatus I. S. Chen, Jaafar & K. T. Shao, 2012
 Obliquogobius megalops Shibukawa & Aonuma, 2007
 Obliquogobius turkayi Goren, 1992
 Obliquogobius yamadai Shibukawa & Aonuma, 2007

References

Gobiidae